The six of hearts is a playing card in the standard 52-card deck.

Six of Hearts may also refer to:
 Six of Hearts (character), a fictional character in The Lab and 'Remote Control"
 Six of Hearts (EP), a 1997 jazz album

See also

 or 

 Two of Hearts (disambiguation)
 Three of Hearts (disambiguation)
 Jack of Hearts (disambiguation)
 Queen of Hearts (disambiguation)
 King of Hearts (disambiguation)
 Ace of Hearts (disambiguation)